Grazing may refer to:
 Grazing, the agricultural practice of feeding grass
 Grazing (behaviour), the animal behaviour

Graze may also refer to:
 a graze, a type of abrasion
 Graze (company), a United Kingdom snacks producer
 Graze, a surname; people with the name include:
 Gerald Graze, American Department of State official
 Stanley Graze, American economist

See also 
 Grazer (disambiguation)
 Grays (disambiguation)